The Thomas-Morse MB-2 was an open-cockpit biplane fighter manufactured by Thomas-Morse Aircraft for the U.S. Army Air Service in 1918.

Development
The MB-2 was designed by B. Douglas Thomas at the same time he was building the MB-1. Powered by a Liberty 12 engine, the first of two two-seat biplanes flew in November 1918. The Army was unimpressed by the performance and did not order any for production. Both prototypes were then scrapped, the second one incomplete.

Specifications

References

Notes

Bibliography
 

1910s United States fighter aircraft
MB-2
Aircraft first flown in 1918